"Time's Up" (also titled "Time's Up!") is a song by American rapper Jadakiss, released on April 20, 2004, as the lead single from his second studio album Kiss of Death (2004). The song features American singer Nate Dogg and was produced by Scott Storch. Lyrically, the song sees Jadakiss rapping about his journey to becoming a rapper in the industry.

Critical reception
The song received positive reviews from critics. Mitch Findlay of HotNewHipHop praised Jadakiss's lyricism on the track, adding, "It's about as cold a banger as they come, a perfect example of Jadakiss' ability to retain crossover appeal while spitting bars at a high caliber."

In an interview with XXL, Jadakiss revealed that Eminem had called him about the lyrics "Fuck riding the beat, nigga / I parallel park on the track", which the latter praised.

Music video
The official music video of the song was directed by Chris Robinson. It finds Jadakiss looking visibly unhappy while rapping, and attending a funeral.

Charts

Release history

References

2004 singles
2004 songs
Jadakiss songs
Nate Dogg songs
Songs written by Jadakiss
Songs written by Nate Dogg
Song recordings produced by Scott Storch
Songs written by Scott Storch
Ruff Ryders Entertainment singles
Interscope Records singles